Tunjungan Plaza (TP) is a superblock in Surabaya and is the second-largest shopping center in Indonesia after Pakuwon Mall, both owned-and-operated by Pakuwon Jati which has its headquarters inside the superblock. Initially inaugurated in 1986, it has a net leaseable area of 253,187 m2, which houses more than 500 retail outlets including boutiques, restaurants, cafes, cinemas, bookstores, supermarkets, and children's arcade center. It is a part of Tunjungan City Superblock, an integrated multi-facilities venue, which includes the mall (Tunjungan Plaza), Menara Mandiri Office Tower at the top of TP 2, Regency Condominium and Sheraton Surabaya Hotel & Towers at the top of TP 3, Four Points by Sheraton at the top of TP 4, The Peak Residence and Pakuwon Center at the top of TP 5, One Icon Residence and Pakuwon Tower at the top of TP 6. First opened on 15 December 1986, it is divided into six buildings: TP 1, TP 2, TP 3, TP 4, TP 5 and TP 6.

History 
Tunjungan Plaza (at that time called Plaza Tunjungan) continued to grow. Starting from the construction that began in 1985, the opening of Plaza Tunjungan I in 1986, changing the name of Plaza Tunjungan to Tunjungan Plaza and changing the mall logo and renovating Tunjungan Plaza I-II in 2007 to renovating Tunjungan Plaza I-IV, opening of Tunjungan Plaza V in 2015 and Tunjungan Plaza VI in 2017.

Plazas

Tunjungan Plaza has some anchor tenants such as Hero Supermarket, Matahari Department Store, Sogo Department Store, Gramedia, Ace Hardware, Electronic Solution, Planet Sports, Informa, Informa-Ashley, XXI Cinema, XXI Cinema (IMAX), Zara, Marks & Spencer, H&M, Uniqlo, LC Waikiki, Pasarame, Chipmunks, Toys Kingdom, Aeon Fantasy Kidzoona.

 Tunjungan Plaza 1, is the first mall in Surabaya opened in 1986 located at Jalan Basuki Rahmat no 8-12. Opened on May 7, but now Plaza East has become a fashionable part since renovations carried out in 2007. The renovation process also includes removing the capsule lift and remodeling the food court into Studio Foodcourt, which is adjacent to the Tunjungan 1 XXI cinema which is equipped with 4 studio.

 Tunjungan Plaza 2 is the first expansion of Plaza Tunjungan shopping district next to Tunjungan Plaza 1 on Jalan Basuki Rahmat no 8-12, which is located between Tunjungan Plaza I and Tunjungan Plaza III which began construction in July 1990 and opened in December 1991. There are Mandiri Tower at the above of this plaza, and the management office of the mall at the 5th Floor. Although it is not as big as its predecessor, Tunjungan Plaza 2 has become one of the most important parts. crowded in this business district. TAJ Tunjungan is an urban style of Muslim, a Muslim fashion center and has the largest prayer room in a mall in Surabaya, now it has become an inseparable part of other Tunjungan Plaza.

 Tunjungan Plaza 3 is the second and the biggest expansion and most extensive of Tunjungan Plaza shopping district located behind TP1 which was opened in 1996. Tunjungan Plaza 3 has a large atrium which is used to host national and regional events. It has a direct access to Sheraton Hotel & Towers as well as Regency Condominium from the TP3 lobby. It also has connections to TP1, TP4, and TP6 (only 1st and 2nd Floor). Apart from a world-class shopping experience, Tunjungan Plaza 3 also offers a classy restaurant (fine dining) which makes it the busiest part of Plaza Tunjungan. At the end of 2016, the Tunjungan 21 cinema was transformed into the Tunjungan 3 XXI cinema, after 20 years the cinema was opened.

 Tunjungan Plaza 4 is the third expansion in Tunjungan Plaza shopping districts which located on Jalan Embong Malang no 7-21 which was opened on November 23, 2001. This section of the Plaza is focused on pampering shoppers and culinary enthusiasts as various international boutiques and selected food outlets enliven the plaza targeting this high-end segment. Sogo Department Store was the biggest anchor tenant of this part of plaza. Four Points Hotel by Sheraton is located on the top of this plaza, which was built together with TP5 and already opened in 2015. This plaza connects to TP3, TP5, and TP6. In mid-2017, all tenants in TP 4 floors LG (except SOGO) were closed and filled by Uniqlo which opened on September 1, 2017.

 Tunjungan Plaza 5, is the fifth stage, above it is The Peak Residence which consists of 52 floors. Construction was carried out in 2012 and completed in 2015 with the opening in September 2015 and inauguration on October 9, 2015. This section of the shopping center has the nickname "Fashion Avenue" which has a variety of fashion outlets, which consist of shopping mall, offices (Pakuwon Center), condominium (The Peak Residences), located on Jalan Embong Malang no. 1-5 houses the "Fashion Avenue" which has many branded fashion retail outlets. It houses the IMAX which operated by XXI Cinema.

 Tunjungan Plaza 6 is the newest part of Tunjungan City Superblock and the new expansion of the mall.  Located on Jalan Embong Malang no 21-31, next to the Sheraton Hotel & Towers, has been operating since September 23, 2017. This shopping center is located next to TP 4. There are two towers at the top of TP 6: One Icon Residence and Pakuwon Tower. TP6 mostly consists of F&B retails and it has a connection bridge to TP3 at the 2nd Floor. This section of the shopping center surrounds the Grand Circle Tunjungan Plaza.

 Tunjungan Plaza 7 was announced during the Grand Opening of TP6 ceremony to be the upcoming project of Pakuwon Group. Pakuwon will expand their mall again for 40,000 m2.

Incident 
On April 13 2022, Tunjungan Plaza 5 caught on fire due to a short-circuit. The fire was extinguished in less than an hour before it could spread to neighboring buildings, and it was confirmed that there were no casualties. Videos of the fire from an outside view surfaced and spread around Indonesian social media users. After the incident, Tunjungan Plaza stayed open while Tunjungan Plaza 5 stayed temporarily closed for repair and investigation.

See also

 Pakuwon Mall
 List of tallest buildings in Surabaya

References

External links
 Official Website

Buildings and structures in Surabaya
Shopping malls in Indonesia
Tourist attractions in East Java
Skyscraper office buildings in Indonesia
Skyscrapers in Surabaya